Novooleksandrivka is an urban-type settlement in Luhansk Raion in Luhansk Oblast of eastern Ukraine. Population:

Demographics
Native language distribution as of the Ukrainian Census of 2001:
 Ukrainian: 45.55%
 Russian: 54.45%

References

Urban-type settlements in Luhansk Raion